Lauriane Genest (born 28 May 1998) is a Canadian professional racing cyclist. She rode in the women's team sprint event at the 2020 UCI Track Cycling World Championships in Berlin, Germany. She qualified to represent Canada at the 2020 Summer Olympics.  Genest would win the bronze medal in the keirin event.

Major results
2021
3rd   keirin, Olympic Games, Tokyo

References

External links
 

1998 births
Living people
French Quebecers
Canadian female cyclists
Cyclists from Montreal
Cyclists at the 2018 Commonwealth Games
Commonwealth Games competitors for Canada
Cyclists at the 2020 Summer Olympics
Olympic cyclists of Canada
Medalists at the 2020 Summer Olympics
Olympic medalists in cycling
Olympic bronze medalists for Canada
Cyclists at the 2022 Commonwealth Games
Commonwealth Games silver medallists for Canada
Commonwealth Games medallists in cycling
20th-century Canadian women
21st-century Canadian women
Medallists at the 2022 Commonwealth Games